The St. Louis Blues are an American professional ice hockey team based in St. Louis, Missouri. They play in the Central Division of the Western Conference in the National Hockey League (NHL). The team joined the NHL in 1967 as an expansion team with five other teams. The Blues first played their home games at the St. Louis Arena until 1994; they play their home games at Enterprise Center, formerly the Scottrade Center and first named the Kiel Center. The franchise has had eleven general managers since their inception.

Key

General managers

See also
List of NHL general managers

Notes
 A running total of the number of general managers of the franchise. Thus any general manager who has two or more separate terms as general manager is only counted once. Interim general managers do not count towards the total.
 Gerry Ehman and Denis Ball have been wrongly identified as general manager when their official title was director of player personnel, whose main duties were to be in charge of the amateur scouting and made decisions regarding the NHL draft. The error must have begun when Chuck Catto was demoted from general manager to director of player personnel on April 7, 1974. Sid Salomon III took on the title of President and Managing Director after the position of general manager was eliminated on August 24, 1974.

References

St. Louis Blues
General managers
St. Louis Blues general managers
general managers